Yangmiao may refer to these places in China:

Yangmiao, Jiangsu, in Yangzhou, Jiangsu
Yangmiao, Changfeng County, in Changfeng County, Anhui
Yangmiao Township, Anhui, in Guzhen County, Anhui
Yangmiao Township, Henan, in Taikang County, Henan